Chicago Fire is an American television drama created by Michael Brandt and Derek Haas, who serve as executive producers alongside Joe Chappelle, Peter Jankowski, Danielle Gelber, Matt Olmstead and Dick Wolf. The series, which premiered on October 10, 2012, airs on NBC.

The series follows the lives of the firefighters and paramedics working at the Chicago Fire Department at the firehouse of Engine Company 51, Truck Company 81, Rescue Squad Company 3, Ambulance 61 and Battalion 25, starring Jesse Spencer as Lieutenant Matthew Casey, Taylor Kinney as Lieutenant Kelly Severide, Yuri Sardarov as firefighter Brian "Otis" Zvonecek who left after the eighth-season premiere,   Charlie Barnett as Firefighter Candidate Peter Mills, who left the series in the third-season episode "You Know Where To Find Me", Monica Raymund as Paramedic in Charge Gabriela Dawson, who left in the seventh season premiere, Lauren German as Paramedic Leslie Elizabeth Shay, who left after the third-season premiere, Eamonn Walker as Deputy District Chief (Formerly Battalion Chief) Wallace Boden, David Eigenberg as firefighter Christopher Herrmann, and Teri Reeves as Doctor Hallie Thomas. Other characters joined the series in later seasons.

The tenth season premiered on September 22, 2021.

Series overview

Episodes

Season 1 (2012–13)

Season 2 (2013–14)

Season 3 (2014–15)

Season 4 (2015–16)

Season 5 (2016–17)

Season 6 (2017–18)

Season 7 (2018–19)

Season 8 (2019–20)

Season 9 (2020–21)

Season 10 (2021–22)

Season 11 (2022–23)

Home media

See also 
 List of Chicago P.D. episodes
 List of Chicago Med episodes
 List of Chicago Justice episodes

References

External links 
 
 

Chicago Fire
Episodes